Cupriavidus laharis is a Gram-negative, oxidase- and catalase-positive,  hydrogen-oxidizing, aerobic, non-spore-forming, motile bacterium with peritrichous flagella of the genus Cupriavidus and family Burkholderiaceae which was isolated from volcanic mudflow deposits on Mount Pinatubo in the Philippines. Colonies of Cupriavidus laharis are opaque and white.

References

External links
Type strain of Cupriavidus laharis at BacDive -  the Bacterial Diversity Metadatabase

Burkholderiaceae
Bacteria described in 2006